The Bath Half Marathon (also known as the "BATHALF") is an annual road running half marathon held in Bath, England, normally on the second or third Sunday in March. It has been held almost every year since 1982. The race was first run in the year after the first London Marathon and has remained a popular race for runners preparing for that event. The next race is scheduled for Sunday 16 October 2022.

It is the largest one-day charity fundraising event in South West England, raising over £2.2 million for charity in 2016. Since 2000 the race has been organised by Bath-based Running High Events Ltd.

Course 

The Bath Half is a fast flat course, straddling both sides of the River Avon. The race starts and finishes in Great Pulteney Street, which with its roadway spanning  is one of the widest Georgian boulevards in Europe. The first mile is gently downhill on Pulteney Road to Churchill Bridge, then the route follows two identical laps from Churchill Bridge, rising up past Green Park station, round Queen Square, then down Charlotte Street and westbound out of the city centre along the A4 road (Upper Bristol Road and Newbridge Road) to Newbridge and crossing the 'New Bridge' at the 'Twerton Fork' at the beginning of the dual carriageway. From here the race heads eastbound on the A36 back towards the city centre, along Lower Bristol Road, before crossing over Churchill Bridge and up Green Park again for the beginning of the second lap. At the end of the second lap the runners pass across Churchill Bridge, then up Pulteney Road to the finish back in Great Pulteney Street.

The course route is unchanged since minor modifications in 2006. It was remeasured in 2006 by IAAF official course measurer Hugh Jones, describing the course as 'officially flat, with three undulations'. The assembly area for the race is the Bath Recreation Ground.

Results

Effects of COVID-19 pandemic 
The 2020 event faced criticism after it went ahead despite the 2019-20 coronavirus pandemic. A number of organisations pulled out, and local MP Wera Hobhouse called for it to be cancelled, saying "protecting the most vulnerable in our city from a further spread of the infection must be the priority." Organisers denied accusations they were irresponsible, and the event took place with half the usual number of participants.  Bath MP Wera Hobhouse later said lives probably would have been saved had the event been cancelled, but the "organiser had no guidance from Government to stop the event." Bath Half race director said "We are not aware of any data or evidence linking outdoor participation events such as the Bath Half with the spread of COVID-19, or with any fatalities from COVID-19 ... In the absence of any such data this type of discussion could be regarded as speculation, even scaremongering."

The 2021 event was first postponed to September, and then cancelled in April 2021 owing to uncertainty surrounding COVID-19 restrictions, combined with planned road closures for improvement works.

References

External links 

 Bath Half Marathon on the ARRS website

Half marathons in the United Kingdom
Half Marathon
Athletics competitions in England
Half Marathon